Nakayamagawa Dam is a gravity dam located in Yamaguchi prefecture in Japan. The dam is used for flood control and water supply. The catchment area of the dam is 15 km2. The dam impounds about 57  ha of land when full and can store 7550 thousand cubic meters of water. The construction of the dam was started on 1974 and completed in 1995.

References

Dams in Yamaguchi Prefecture
1995 establishments in Japan